Loix is a commune in the south-west of France, located on the north coast of the Île de Ré, in the department of Charente-Maritime (region Nouvelle-Aquitaine). Its inhabitants are called Loidais and Loidaises .

Geography 
 Loix is the smallest village and has the smallest port of the island of Ré, and is located in the middle of the salt marshes. It is a peninsula in the island, bordered by the Pier of Ars to the west and the pit of Loix to the east. Only a road, bordered by marshes (and salt marshes) gained over the sea by containment, connects Loix to the rest of the island.
 Low shore, pebbles, bay and small beach in the shape of cove in the south east (pit of Loix).
 At sea, a lighthouse : the Ilates.

Toponymy 
The origin of the name of the commune seems rather vague.

According to the historian Louis-Étienne Arcère, "A decree of Charles V of the year 1372, gives to the Island the name of Loys"

It may be noted, however, that in relation to the ancient island on which the locality is located, it bore the names of Loye (1684 and 1757) and Oye (1675).

History 
In 1627, English forces led by the Duke of Buckingham besieged the island. On the 8th of November of that year, at the place called "Feneau", the English were caught in their retreat from the Siege of Saint-Martin-de-Ré. The French and English forces then fought the Battle of the Pont du Feneau, which ended the English invasion. Jean Caylar d'Anduze de Saint-Bonnet, called Toiras, along with the fleet of Louis XIII and Richelieu, repelled the forces of Buckingham, forcing him to abandon the siege and return to England.

Population

See also
 Communes of the Charente-Maritime department

References

External links
 

Communes of Charente-Maritime
Île de Ré
Populated coastal places in France